Ballyphilip is a civil parish and townland (of 180 acres) in County Down, Northern Ireland. It is situated in the historic barony of Ards Upper.

Settlements
The civil parish includes the following settlements:
Portaferry

Townlands
Ballyphilip civil parish contains the following townlands:

Ardgeehan
Ballyblack
Ballycam
Ballygarvigan
Ballyphilip
Ballyrusley
Craigaroddan
Derry
Granagh
Knockinelder
Tullyboard
Tullymally
Tullynacrew

See also
List of civil parishes of County Down

References